This is an incomplete list of plants with trifoliate leaves. Trifoliate leaves (also known as trifoliolate or ternate leaves) are a leaf shape characterized by a leaf divided into three leaflets. Species which are known to be trifoliate are listed here. Genera which are characteristically trifoliate are also listed, with species underneath. Genera which are generally not trifoliate are not listed; only the trifoliate species are. Entries are currently listed in alphabetical order, but in the future it may be desirable to list them by families. It may also be desirable to include common names and references.

A
Acer cissifolium
Acer griseum
Acer mandshuricum
Acer maximowiczianum
Acer triflorum
Adenocarpus spp.
Aegle marmelos
Amphicarpaea spp.
Anagyris spp.
Anthyllis spp.
Aphyllodium spp.
Aquilegia grata
Aquilegia vulgaris
Argyrolobium spp.
Aspalathus spp.

B
Baptisia spp.
Baptisia australis
Bituminaria spp.
Bituminaria bituminosa
Bolusafra spp.
Bolusia spp.
Burtonia spp.
Butea spp.

C
Cajanus spp.
Calopogonium spp.
Canavalia spp.
Carmichaelia spp.
Christia spp.
Clematis aristata
Cleome serrulata
Clitoria spp.
Collaea spp.
Cologania spp.
Crotalaria spp.
Cyclopia spp.
Commiphora wightii
Cyamopsis spp.
Cytisus spp.
Cytisus scoparius

D
Desmodium spp.
Derris spp.
Dicentra cucullaria
Dichilus spp.
Dioclea spp.
Dolichos spp.
Dorycnium spp.
Dumasia spp.

E
Eleiotis spp.
Eriosema spp.
Erythrina spp.
Esenbeckia runyonii

F
Fagonia spp.Fagonia arabicaFagonia laevisFlemingia spp.ForsythiaFragaria chiloensisGGalactia spp.Genista spp.Genista monspessulanaGenista stenopetalaGlycine spp.
Goodia spp.

H–K
Helicotropis spp.
Hymenocarpos spp.
Hypocalyptus spp.
Indigofera spp.
Kennedia spp.

L
Lablab spp.
Laburnum
Lebeckia spp.
Lespedeza spp.
Lotononis spp.
Lotus spp.

M
Martiodendron spp.
Medicago spp.
Medicago truncatula
Melilotus spp.
Menyanthes trifoliata
Mucuna spp.

N
Nandina domestica

O
Ononis spp.
Otoptera spp.
Oxalis spp.
Oxalis corniculata
Oxalis tuberosa

P
Pachyrhizus spp.
Parochetus spp.
Pinellia ternata
Piptanthus spp.
Phaseolus spp.
Poncirus trifoliata
Potentilla indica
Psophocarpus spp.
Pterocarpus santalinus
Pueraria spp.
Pueraria edulis
Pueraria lobata
Pueraria montana
Pueraria phaseoloides
Pueraria thompsonii

R
Ranzania japonica
Rhus integrifolia
Rhus lancea
Rhus pyroides
Rhus trilobata
Rhynchosia spp.
Rothia spp.
Rubus spp.
Rubus spectabilis

S
Sigmoidotropis spp.
Sumac spp.
Stylosanthes spp.
Sweetia spp.

T
Taverniera spp.
Teramnus spp.
Tiarella trifoliata
Toxicodendron radicans
Toxicodendron rydbergii
Triphasia spp.
Triphasia trifolia
Trifolium spp.
Trifolium campestre
Trifolium hybridum
Trifolium incarnatum
Trifolium pratense
Trigonella spp.

U–Z
Ulex spp.
Ulex europaeus
Ulex gallii
Vigna spp.
Wiborgia spp.

References

Trifoliate plants
Plant morphology